Grad Associates formerly Grad Partnership and Frank Grad & Sons, was an architectural firm based in Newark, New Jersey. Founded in 1906 by Frank Grad (1882–1968), the company was later run by his sons, Bernard (d. August 4, 2000) and Howard (d. 1992).  The company closed its doors on February 19, 2010.

Born in Austria, Frank Grad was educated at the Newark Arts School (the forerunner of Arts High School). He began his Newark architectural practice in 1906. Grad was capable of working in many styles, from the Beaux-Arts, YMHA on MLK Boulevard, to the Spanish colonial Stanley Theater and Beth Israel Hospital, to the Neo-Classical Newark Symphony Hall, to the Art Deco 1180 Raymond Boulevard (aka, the Lefcourt Building). Several of Grad's greatest commissions, the YMHA, the Stanley Theater, Beth Israel, and the Lefcourt Building, were for Jewish patrons. In the mid-1930s the name of the firm became Frank Grad & Sons. Grad died in 1968.

His firm, Grad Associates was continued by his sons after Grad died. Grad Associates peaked in the 1980s when there were over 130 architects working there, but closed in the winter of 2010, a victim of the Great Recession. The firm added new partners in 1966, and became the Grad Partnership. In 1990, the firm became GRAD Associates, P.A. At the time the firm closed the managing partners were Allen Trousdale and Vasant Kshirsagar. Grad was one of the first large firms in the New York region to invest in extensive computer-aided design facilities.

Notable buildings
 Izod Center including the Pegasus Restaurant
 Harborside Financial Center
 Seton Hall University School of Law at One Newark Center
 Newark Legal Center
 Newark Liberty International Airport Continental Airlines Terminal and Atlantic City International Airport
 1180 Raymond Boulevard, originally the Lefcourt Building
 One Newark Center
 University Heights, Newark, New Jersey
 James V. Forrestal Building in Washington, D.C.
 Stanley Theater/Newark Gospel Tabernacle 
 Essex House New York on Central Park
 General Electric Regional Distribution Center, Englewood Cliffs, New Jersey
 General Public Utilities, Parsippany-Troy Hills, New Jersey
 Howard Savings Bank Office Complex, Livingston, New Jersey
 Mt. Airy Associates I, II, III, IV, V Bernards Township, New Jersey
 Nabisco World Headquarters - Planting, Livingston, New Jersey
Newark Symphony Hall
 New Jersey Bell Corporate Data Center II, Freehold, New Jersey
 Overlook Farms, Readington Township, New Jersey
 Park 80 Addition, Saddlebrook, New Jersey
 Prudential Eastern Home Office, Parsippany-Troy Hills, New Jersey
 Prudential Property & Casualty Insurance Co, Holmdel Township, New Jersey
 Prudential Supply Processing Center, New Providence, New Jersey
 Rockaway Farms, Tewksbury Township, New Jersey
 Springfield Farms, Tewksbury Township, New Jersey
 Two University Plaza, Hackensack, New Jersey
 Windemere at Hanover, Hanover Township, New Jersey
 Xerox Corporation - Parking, Webster, New York
 Essex County College - Newark, New Jersey

Notable staff
 Philip J. Kowalski 
 Howard Horii 
 Susan Santiago 
 Tim Klesse 
 Ronald H. Schmidt

See also
John H. & Wilson C. Ely

References

External links
 
 
 

Architecture firms of the United States
Architecture firms based in New Jersey
Defunct architecture firms based in New Jersey
Design companies established in 1906
Companies based in Newark, New Jersey
1906 establishments in New Jersey
Design companies disestablished in 2010
2010 disestablishments in New Jersey